Eucharis candida is a plant species native to Colombia, Ecuador and Peru but cultivated as an ornamental in many other regions.

Eucharis candida is a bulb-forming her with broadly lanceolate to elliptical leaves, pleated lengthwise. Flowers are drooping, borne in umbels. Tepals are white, egg-shaped, reflexed (curling backwards) to reveal the yellow anthers.

References

External links

candida
Flora of Peru
Flora of Colombia
Flora of Ecuador
Garden plants
Plants described in 1853